Yinlu Foods is a Chinese company, specializing in manufacturing processed and prepared foods and beverages. In 2011, Nestlé purchased 60% of Yinlu Foods, and became the parent company and main shareholder.

In 2012, the company employed more than 10,000 people at three factories, and was constructing two more. Its 2010 revenues were equivalent to US$812 million.

References

Food and drink companies of China
Nestlé